Braum is a surname. It is an Americanized form of the German surname Brahm, as well as an Ashkenazi Jewish surname which may have originated as a variant of Braun. The 2010 United States Census found 250 people with the surname Braum, making it the 76,768th-most-common name in the country. This represented a decrease from 279 (66,274th-most-common) in the 2000 Census. In both censuses, roughly nine-tenths of the bearers of the surname identified as White.

People and fictional characters with the name include:
Bill Braum, founder of American restaurant chain Braum's
Bohuslav Braum (born 1956), Czech weightlifter
Daniel M. Braum, 1966 recipient of the American Society of Industrial Engineers' Gilbreth Medal
Braum, the Heart of Freljord, League of Legends character voiced by JB Blanc

References

Americanized surnames
Jewish surnames